Omorgus tessellatus is a beetle of the family Trogidae.

References 

tessellatus
Beetles described in 1854